The chief minister of Andhra Pradesh is the chief executive of the Indian state of Andhra Pradesh. In accordance with the Constitution of India, the governor is a state's de jure head, but de facto executive authority rests with the chief minister. Following elections to the Andhra Pradesh Legislative Assembly, the state's governor usually invites the party (or coalition) with a majority of seats to form the government. The governor appoints the chief minister, whose council of ministers are collectively responsible to the assembly. Given that he has the confidence of the assembly, the chief minister's term is for five years and is subject to no term limits.

Since 1956, Andhra Pradesh has had 17 chief ministers, A majority of them belonged to the Indian National Congress party. The longest-serving chief minister, N. Chandrababu Naidu from Telugu Desam Party held the office for over thirteen years in multiple tenure. N. Chandrababu Naidu is also the first chief minister of Andhra Pradesh after the state bifurcation in 2014. The Indian National Congress's Kasu Brahmananda Reddy has the second-longest tenure and the Telugu Desam Party's founder N. T. Rama Rao, the second actor to become the chief minister in India has the third-longest tenure, while N. Bhaskara Rao from same party has the shortest tenure (only 31 days). One chief minister, Neelam Sanjeeva Reddy of the Indian National Congress party, later became the president of India. while another, P. V. Narasimha Rao of the same party, later became the prime minister of India. There have been three instances of president's rule in Andhra Pradesh, most recently in 2014.

The current incumbent is Y. S. Jagan Mohan Reddy of the Yuvajana Shramika Rythu Congress Party since 30 May 2019.

List of chief ministers

Chief ministers of Andhra State 

Andhra State consisted of Uttarandhra, Kostha Andhra and Rayalaseema regions. This state was carved out of Madras State in 1953.

Chief ministers of Andhra Pradesh
On 1 November 1956, Hyderabad State ceased to exist; its Gulbarga and Aurangabad divisions were merged into Mysore State and Bombay State respectively. Its remaining Telugu-speaking portion, Telangana, was merged with Andhra State to form the new state of Andhra Pradesh. The state was bifurcated into Andhra Pradesh and Telangana states on 2 June 2014 by Andhra Pradesh Reorganisation Act, 2014. After state re-organisation, the number of sabha seats come down from 294 to 175.

Notes

See also
 History of Andhra Pradesh
 Elections in Andhra Pradesh
 List of governors of Andhra Pradesh
 List of chief ministers of Telangana
 List of current Indian chief ministers
 List of deputy chief ministers of Andhra Pradesh

References

External links 

  Official Website of the Office of the Chief Minister

Andhra Pradesh
Chief Ministers of Andhra Pradesh
People from Andhra Pradesh
Andhra Pradesh-related lists
Lists of people from Andhra Pradesh